Hodder is an English surname, derived from the Old English word "hod", meaning hood.

People
Christopher Hodder-Williams (1926–1995), British writer
Francis Hodder (1906–1943), Irish cricketer, rugby union player and Royal Air Force officer
Harvey Hodder  (born 1943), Canadian politician
Ian Hodder (born 1948), British archaeologist
Jim Hodder (musician) (1947–1990), American musician, from Steely Dan
Kane Hodder (born 1955), American actor and stuntman
Mark Hodder (fl. 2010–2015), English writer
Michael Hodder (1968–1999), British train driver killed in the Ladbroke Grove rail crash
Stephen Hodder, MBE (born 1956), English architect
Walter Hodder (born 1909-1993), Canadian educater and politician 
Jim Hodder (politician) (1940-2021), Canadian politician 
Mary Hodder (born 1945), Canadian politician

Other uses
Hodder & Stoughton, a British publisher
Kane Hodder (band), American hardcore band
River Hodder, a river in Lancashire, England

See also
 Hoder (disambiguation)
 Hodor (disambiguation)